Halekii-Pihana Heiau State Monument is a  park containing two important luakini heiau on a high ridge near the mouth of Iao Stream in Wailuku, Maui. Both Halekii and Pihana were associated with important Hawaiian chiefs, have been closely studied by archaeologists, and overlook the fertile Nā Wai Ehā ('Four Waters') region irrigated by the Wailuku, Waikapu, Waihee and Waiehu streams. The heiau complex was added to the National Register of Historic Places on 25 November 1985.

Pihana ('fullness' or 'gathering') is also known as Piihana and Pihanakalani ('gathering of the supernatural'). It began as a small temple site between 1260 and 1400, was expanded between 1410 and 1640 to serve as a residence and luakini (war/sacrificial) temple for Kiihewa, who lived at the time of Kakae, the father of Kahekili I.

Halekii ('image house' or "Tiki House") was added along the crest of the hill at about this time, reputedly at the instigation of chief Kihapiilani. Both were greatly expanded into their present shape between 1662 and 1705, and Pihana was enhanced and reoriented to face the island of Hawaii during a period of interisland warfare between 1684 and 1778. In 1790, after the forces of Kamehameha I won the very deadly Battle of Kepaniwai, his son Liholiho rededicated Pihana.

See also
List of Hawaii state parks

References

Heiau
Protected areas of Maui
State parks of Hawaii
Properties of religious function on the National Register of Historic Places in Hawaii
History of Maui
Protected areas established in 1985
1985 establishments in Hawaii